Cutts Harman (1706–1784) was an 18th-century Anglican priest in Ireland.

Harman was born in Newcastle, County Longford   and educated at Trinity College, Dublin.  He was Dean of Waterford from 1759  until his death.

References

Alumni of Trinity College Dublin
Deans of Waterford
People from County Longford
1706 births
1784 deaths
18th-century Irish Anglican priests